Peter Thomas Mahon  (1 November 1923 – 11 August 1986) was a New Zealand High Court judge. He led a Commission of Inquiry into the 1979 crash of Air New Zealand Flight 901 into Mount Erebus. His assessment of the airline's witnesses having engaged in "an orchestrated litany of lies" is one of the most well-known quotes in New Zealand, brought him offline with the establishment and made him a national hero.

Early life and family
Born in Christchurch on 1 November 1923, Mahon was the son of Agnes Helen Mahon (née Tankard) and Cecil Owen Mahon. He was educated at St Bede's College and went on to study law at Canterbury University College from 1940.

After two years at university, Mahon enlisted in the 2nd New Zealand Expeditionary Force, seeing active service in Italy and rising to the rank of second lieutenant, and then serving in J Force after the end of the war. He subsequently returned to complete his Bachelor of Laws degree and was admitted to the bar in 1947.

Early legal career
Mahon began his legal career with the Raymond, Donnelly & Co.  He was mentored by Sir Arthur Donnelly. Mahon was junior counsel for the prosecution in the Parker–Hulme murder case in 1954.  At the commencement of the trial Mahon was assisting Alan Brown.  Brown withdrew during the trial and was later admitted to Sunnyside Hospital.

Erebus inquiry
After the crash of Air New Zealand Flight 901 with loss of all aboard on 28 November 1979, New Zealand's official accident report was released by the Chief Inspector of Air Accidents, Ron Chippindale, which cited serious pilot error as the chief cause of the accident. Public demand led to the formation of a Royal Commission of Inquiry into the accident. Mahon produced his report on 27 April 1981, which cleared the crew of blame for the disaster and found that the major cause was the reprogramming of the aircraft's navigation computer without the crew being notified. Mahon claimed that Air New Zealand executives had engaged in a conspiracy to whitewash the inquiry, covering up evidence and lying to investigators, and concluded that they had told  "an orchestrated litany of lies". His book, Verdict on Erebus, an account of his inquiry, won the New Zealand Book Awards prize for non-fiction in 1985. Mahon retired from the High Court bench in 1982.

In 1983 the Judicial Committee of the Privy Council held that Mahon had made serious mistakes of law through acting in excess of his jurisdiction and in breach of natural justice by going on to make findings of a conspiracy by Air New Zealand to cover up the errors of the ground staff. This conclusion was reached on the point of law that those accused of the conspiracy had not been given an opportunity to contest it in Mr Justice Mahon's inquiry: his conclusions that documents had been suppressed, and that witnesses had lied, were not set aside as an appellate court is not permitted to investigate findings of fact.

In 1985 Mahon was appointed as Commissioner of Inquiry into the 1984 Queen Street riot.  In the same year he published Dear Sam, a collection of his letters to his children. He died of heart failure in August 1986.

In 1999 Transport Minister Maurice Williamson tabled Mahon's findings in parliament. His report had not previously been officially accepted as the verdict on the Erebus tragedy. In 2008, Mahon was posthumously awarded the Jim Collins Memorial Award by the New Zealand Airline Pilots Association for exceptional contributions to air safety, "in forever changing the general approach used in transport accidents investigations world wide." In the 1988 TVNZ dramatisation of the inquiry, Erebus: The Aftermath, Mahon was played by Frank Finlay.

See also
Air New Zealand Flight 901
Erebus: The Aftermath (TV miniseries)

References

Publications
Verdict on Erebus, Collins, 1984, 
Dear Sam, Fontana/Collins, 1985, collection of letters to family and friends

1923 births
1986 deaths
20th-century New Zealand judges
New Zealand King's Counsel
High Court of New Zealand judges
New Zealand military personnel of World War II
People from Christchurch
People educated at St Bede's College, Christchurch
University of Canterbury alumni